Ego Tripping at the Gates of Hell is an EP by The Flaming Lips, released on Warner Bros. Records in late 2003.

It was released while At War With the Mystics, the full-length follow-up to Yoshimi Battles the Pink Robots, was being recorded. Despite being named after the Yoshimi... album track "Ego Tripping at the Gates of Hell", the song is not the lead track and does not even appear in its original form, but rather as two club-oriented remixes.

Track listing

References

2003 EPs
The Flaming Lips EPs
Warner Records EPs
Albums produced by Dave Fridmann
Albums recorded at Tarbox Road Studios